Imeni Dzerzhinskogo may refer to:
Imeni Dzerzhinskogo, Armenia, a town in Armenia
Imeni Dzerzhinskogo, Russia, name of several rural localities in Russia